Hang Seng Indexes Company Limited (HSI) is a private company in Hong Kong and wholly owned by Hang Seng Bank. HSI was founded in 1984 and is the major provider of stock market indexes on Hong Kong and China stock markets such as in Shanghai and Shenzhen.

Products
HSI produces stock market indexes under 5 categories:

Market Cap-weighted Indexes
Factor & Strategy Indexes
Sector Indexes
Sustainability Indexes
Fixed Income Indexes

Currently, the HSI produced indexes comprises over 400 real-time and daily indexes. The most famous and popular referenced is the Hang Seng Index.

New Index Launch

2011
In February, HSI launched the HSI Volatility index or "VHSI". This index models on the lines of the Chicago Board Options Exchange VIX index. VHSI measures the 30-calendar-day expected volatility of the Hang Seng index using prices of options traded on the index.

2017
In November, HSI has launched three Stock Connect Hong Kong Indexes.

2018
In January, HSI has launched Hang Seng SCHK New Economy Index.

2020 
HSI launched the Hang Seng Tech Index, which tracks companies like Tencent, Meituan Dianping and Xiaomi, on 27 July 2020.

See also
Hang Seng Bank
Hang Seng Index

References

External links
Official website

Hang Seng Bank
Hang Seng Index
Financial services companies of Hong Kong
Market data
Financial data vendors